Revenue is income that a company receives from normal business activities. It may also refer to:

 Revenue Commissioners, a tax agency in Ireland
 HM Revenue and Customs, a tax agency in the United Kingdom
 Revenue Act, several tax-related laws of the same name
 Revenue (album)